Bharat Chandra Narah (born 14 October 1957) is an Indian National Congress politician from Assam and MLA serving his sixth term from Naoboicha constituency since 2021. He was previously a five-term MLA of Dhakuakhana constituency, 1985-2011, and a cabinet minister in the Assam government, 1985-1987, 1988-1990, and 2001-2011. He was the Chief Minister's Press Advisor with cabinet rank, 2012-2016. Before joining Congress, Narah was a member of the Asom Gana Parishad. He was also a leader of the All Assam Students' Union. Narah is the husband of former Union Minister and four-term Congress MP, Ranee Narah.

References 

Living people
Asom Gana Parishad politicians
Indian National Congress politicians from Assam
Assam MLAs 1985–1991
Assam MLAs 1991–1996
Assam MLAs 1996–2001
Assam MLAs 2001–2006
Assam MLAs 2006–2011
People from Lakhimpur district
Indian Hindus
1957 births